Domingos Chivavele (born 12 May 1966) is a Mozambican swimmer. He competed in the men's 100 metre freestyle at the 1984 Summer Olympics.

References

External links
 

1966 births
Living people
Mozambican male freestyle swimmers
Olympic swimmers of Mozambique
Swimmers at the 1984 Summer Olympics
Place of birth missing (living people)